Ebontius (died 1104), also known as Ebon, Pontius, or Ponce, was Bishop of Barbastro, Spain, after its recapture from the Moors. Born in Comminges, Haute Garonne, France, he became a Benedictine and abbot before accepting the See of Babastro.

Notes

12th-century French people
12th-century people from the Kingdom of Aragon
French Roman Catholic saints
Spanish Roman Catholic saints
12th-century Christian saints
1104 deaths
French Benedictines
12th-century Roman Catholic bishops in Spain
Year of birth unknown